The Spend A Buck Handicap was an American Grade III  Thoroughbred horse race run between 1991 and 2012 at Calder Race Course in Miami Gardens, Florida. Open to horses age three and older, it was contested on dirt over a distance of  miles (8.5 furlongs).

The race was named in honor of Spend a Buck, winner of the 1985 Kentucky Derby and a Calder Race Course Hall of Fame inductee.  Since inception the race has been contested at various distances and under different conditions:
 miles : 1991, 1997–present
 1 mile, 70 yards : 1992, run as the Spend A Buck Overnight Handicap for three-year-olds
  miles: 1994–1996

Records
Speed  record: (at current distance of  miles)
 1:42.59 – Best of the Rest (2001)

Most wins:
 2 – Best of the Rest (1999, 2001)
 2 – Mad Flatter (2010, 2011)

Most wins by a jockey:
 3 – Eibar Coa (1999, 2001, 2004)

Most wins by a trainer:
 2 – Martin D. Wolfson (1998, 2008)
 2 – Edward Plesa Jr. (1999, 2001)
 2 – Jeffrey Thornbury (2010, 2011)

Most wins by an owner:
 2 – Bea Oxenberg (1999, 2001)

Winners

 † In 1992 the race was run as the Spend a Buck Overnight Handicap for three-year-olds.

References

Discontinued horse races
Open middle distance horse races
Horse races in Florida
Graded stakes races in the United States
Recurring events established in 1991
Recurring events established in 2013
Calder Race Course